Lone Mountain is a neighborhood and a historic hill in west-central San Francisco, California. It is the present-site of the northern half of the  University of San Francisco's main campus. It was once the location of the Lone Mountain Cemetery, a complex encompassing the Laurel Hill, Calvary, Masonic, and Odd Fellows Cemeteries.

History 
Lone Mountain is one of San Francisco's historic hills. The Spanish name for Lone Mountain was El Divisadero, from the Spanish divisadero, which means a point from which one can look far.

The Lone Mountain Cemetery was opened on May 30, 1854. In 1867, the cemetery was renamed Laurel Hill Cemetery. After decades of litigation and public debate, the gravesite remains were all moved primarily to Cypress Lawn Memorial Park in the city of Colma, immediately south of San Francisco. In what writer Harold Gilliam described as "an act of civic vandalism," thousands of crypts and mausoleums were unearthed, the granite and marble dumped along the Pacific shoreline to reinforce seawalls. 

The Lone Mountain College (formerly Sacred Heart Academy and San Francisco College for Women) was founded in 1898; and changed leadership and ownership many times, before becoming part of USF. The Lone Mountain area is also known as "University Terrace" because of the terraces that connect the two USF campuses.

Neighborhood 
The Lone Mountain neighborhood of San Francisco is a vibrant and includes residential, commercial, and a university community. It is also home to the Angelo J. Rossi Playground and Rossi Pool located at Arguello Boulevard and Anza Street.

See also
 List of San Francisco, California Hills
 San Francisco Columbarium & Funeral Home

References

External links
  
Encyclopedia of San Francisco Article on cemeteries

Hills of San Francisco
History of San Francisco
Mountains of the San Francisco Bay Area
University of San Francisco
Neighborhoods in San Francisco
